The 1968 USC Trojans baseball team represented the University of Southern California in the 1968 NCAA University Division baseball season. The team was coached Rod Dedeaux in his 27th season.

The Trojans won the College World Series, defeating the Southern Illinois Salukis in the championship game.

Roster

Schedule 

! style="background:#FFCC00;color:#990000;"| Regular Season
|- valign="top" 

|- align="center" bgcolor="ddffdd"
| February 23 ||  || 9–4 || 1–0 || –
|- align="center" bgcolor="ddffdd"
| February 24 ||  || 5–3 || 2–0 || –
|- align="center" bgcolor="ddffdd"
| February 24 || San Diego State || 2–0 || 3–0 || –
|- align="center" bgcolor="ddffdd"
| February 28 ||  || 9–2 || 4–0 || –
|-

|- align="center" bgcolor="ffdddd"
| March 1 || at  || 0–2 || 4–1 || –
|- align="center" bgcolor="ffdddd"
| March 2 ||  || 0–1 || 4–2 || –
|- align="center" bgcolor="#ffdddd"
| March 4 || at  || 0–3 || 4–3 || –
|- align="center" bgcolor="ddffdd"
| March 11 || at  || 7–4 || 5–3 || –
|- align="center" bgcolor="ffdddd"
| March 12 ||  || 0–3 || 5–4 || –
|- align="center" bgcolor="ddffdd"
| March 15 ||  || 2–1 || 6–4 || –
|- align="center" bgcolor="ffdddd"
| March 16 ||  || 0–7 || 6–5 || –
|- align="center" bgcolor="ddffdd"
| March 16 || BYU || 3–0 || 7–5 || –
|- align="center" bgcolor="ddffdd"
| March 19 ||  || 2–1 || 8–5 || –
|- align="center" bgcolor="ffdddd"
| March 22 || Long Beach State || 0–3 || 8–6 || –
|- align="center" bgcolor="ddffdd"
| March 25 ||  || 4–0 || 9–6 || –
|- align="center" bgcolor="ddffdd"
| March 26 || Cal State Los Angeles || 9–3 || 10–6 || –
|- align="center" bgcolor="ddffdd"
| March 29 ||  || 9–3 || 11–6 || –
|- align="center" bgcolor="ffdddd"
| March 30 ||  || 4–9 || 11–7 || –
|-

|- align="center" bgcolor="ddffdd"
| April 2 || Chapman || 6–2 || 12–7 || –
|- align="center" bgcolor="ffdddd"
| April 5 ||  || 5–6 || 12–8 || –
|- align="center" bgcolor="ddffdd"
| || at  || 16–0 || 13–8 || –
|- align="center" bgcolor="ddffdd"
| || vs.  || 4–0 || 14–8 || –
|- align="center" bgcolor="ddffdd"
| || vs.  || 7–0 || 15–8 || –
|- align="center" bgcolor="ddffdd"
| || vs.  || 10–4 || 16–8 || –
|- align="center" bgcolor="ffdddd"
| April 16 || UC Santa Barbara || 3–12 || 16–9 || –
|- align="center" bgcolor="ddffdd"
| April 19 || at  || 8–5 || 17–9 || 1–0
|- align="center" bgcolor="ddffdd"
| April 20 || at Stanford || 3–1 || 18–9 || 2–0
|- align="center" bgcolor="ddddff"
| April 20 || at Stanford || 2–2 || 18–9–1 || 2–0–1
|- align="center" bgcolor="ddffdd"
| April 23 || San Fernando Valley State || 8–6 || 19–9–1 || –
|- align="center" bgcolor="ddffdd"
| April 26 ||  || 7–3 || 20–9–1 || 3–0–1
|- align="center" bgcolor="ddffdd"
| April 27 ||  || 4–1 || 21–9–1 || 4–0–1
|- align="center" bgcolor="ddffdd"
| April 27 || Oregon || 6–3 || 22–9–1 || 5–0–1
|- align="center" bgcolor="ddffdd"
| April 29 ||  || 9–4 || 23–9–1 || 6–0–1
|- align="center" bgcolor="ddffdd"
| April 29 || Washington || 16–10 || 24–9–1 || 7–0–1
|- align="center" bgcolor="ddffdd"
| April 30 ||  || 4–3 || 25–9–1 || 8–0–1
|-

|- align="center" bgcolor="#ffdddd"
| May 3 ||  || 4–7 || 25–10–1 || 8–1–1
|- align="center" bgcolor="#ddffdd"
| May 4 || UCLA || 8–3 || 26–10–1 || 9–1–1
|- align="center" bgcolor="#ddffdd"
| May 7 || Cal Poly Pomona || 3–0 || 27–10–1 || –
|- align="center" bgcolor="#ddffdd"
| May 10 || Stanford || 4–3 || 28–10–1 || 10–1–1
|- align="center" bgcolor="#ddffdd"
| May 11 || California || 3–1 || 29–10–1 || 11–1–1
|- align="center" bgcolor="#ddffdd"
| May 11 || California || 8–1 || 30–10–1 || 12–1–1
|- align="center" bgcolor="ddffdd"
| May 14 ||  || 10–1 || 31–10–1 || –
|- align="center" bgcolor="#ddffdd"
| May 17 || at Washington || 10–4 || 32–10–1 || 13–1–1
|- align="center" bgcolor="#ffdddd"
| May 18 || at Washington State || 3–9 || 32–11–1 || 13–2–1
|- align="center" bgcolor="#ddffdd"
| May 18 || at Washington State || 6–1 || 33–11–1 || 14–2–1
|- align="center" bgcolor="#ddffdd"
| May 21 || at Oregon || 11–6 || 34–11–1 || 15–2–1
|- align="center" bgcolor="#ddffdd"
| May 25 || at UCLA || 11–2 || 35–11–1 || 16–2–1
|-

|-
! style="background:#FFCC00;color:#990000;"| Post–Season
|-
|-

|- align="center" bgcolor="ddffdd"
| May 31 || vs. Cal State Los Angeles || 4–2 || 36–11–1
|- align="center" bgcolor="ffdddd"
| June 1 || vs. Cal State Los Angeles || 4–8 || 36–12–1
|- align="center" bgcolor="ddffdd"
| June 1 || vs. Cal State Los Angeles || 5–4 || 37–12–1
|-

|- align="center" bgcolor="ddffdd"
| June 11 || vs. BYU || Rosenblatt Stadium || 5–3 || 38–12–1
|- align="center" bgcolor="ddffdd"
| June 12 || vs. Oklahoma State || Rosenblatt Stadium || 6–5 || 39–12–1
|- align="center" bgcolor="ddffdd"
| June 13 || vs.  || Rosenblatt Stadium || 7–6 || 40–12–1
|- align="center" bgcolor="ddffdd"
| June 14 || vs.  || Rosenblatt Stadium || 2–0 || 41–12–1
|- align="center" bgcolor="ddffdd"
| June 15 || vs. Southern Illinois || Rosenblatt Stadium || 4–3 || 42–12–1
|-

Awards and honors 
Jim Barr
 All-Pac-8 Second Team

Reid Braden
 All-Pac-8 First Team

Pat Harrison
 All-America First Team
 All-Pac-8 First Team

Bill Lee
 College World Series All-Tournament Team
 All-Pac-8 Honorable Mention

Chuck Ramshaw
 All-Pac-8 Second Team

Bill Seinsoth
 College World Series Most Outstanding Player
 All-America First Team

Steve Sogge
 All-Pac-8 First Team

Trojans in the 1968 MLB Draft 
The following members of the USC baseball program were drafted in the 1968 Major League Baseball Draft.

June regular draft

June secondary draft

January secondary draft

References 

USC
USC Trojans baseball seasons
College World Series seasons
NCAA Division I Baseball Championship seasons
Pac-12 Conference baseball champion seasons
USC Trojans